Royal Naval Air Station Maydown or RNAS Maydown (HMS Shrike) is a former Fleet Air Arm base located  northeast of Derry, County Londonderry and  west of Limavady, County Londonderry, Northern Ireland.

Units
A number of units were here at some point:

Current use
The site is currently used by industry.

See also
 List of air stations of the Royal Navy

References

Citations

Bibliography

Royal Naval Air Stations in Northern Ireland
Royal Air Force satellite landing grounds